El Protector (2015) was an annual professional wrestling major event produced by Mexican professional wrestling promotion International Wrestling Revolution Group (IWRG), which took place on February 15, 2015 in Arena Naucalpan, Naucalpan, State of Mexico, Mexico. The 2015 El Protector was the fourth annual event produced under that name and the second to be held in February. The focal point of the show was the El Protector tag team tournament where seven teams competed for the trophy.

Production

Background
Lucha Libre has a tradition for a tournament where a rookie, or novato, would be teamed up with an experienced veteran wrestler for a tag team tournament in the hopes of giving the Novato a chance to show case their talent and move up the ranks. Consejo Mundial de Lucha Libre has held a Torneo Gran Alternativa ("Great Alternative Tournament") almost every year since 1994, but the concept predates the creation of the Gran Alternativa. The Mexican professional wrestling company International Wrestling Revolution Group (IWRG; at times referred to as Grupo Internacional Revolución in Mexico) started their own annual rookie/veteran tournament in 2010. The first two tournaments were called Torneo Relampago de Proyeccion a Nuevas Promesas de la Lucha Libre (Spanish for "Projecting a new promise lightning tournament") but would be renamed the El Protector tournament in 2012. The El Protector shows, as well as the majority of the IWRG shows in general, are held in "Arena Naucalpan", owned by the promoters of IWRG and their main arena. The 2015 El Protector show was the sixth time that IWRG promoted a show around the rookie/veteran tournament, with the name changing to El Protector in 2012 and onwards.

Storylines
The event featured nine professional wrestling matches with different wrestlers involved in pre-existing scripted feuds, plots and storylines. Wrestlers were portrayed as either heels (referred to as rudos in Mexico, those that portray the "bad guys") or faces (técnicos in Mexico, the "good guy" characters) as they followed a series of tension-building events, which culminated in a wrestling match or series of matches.

Tournament participants
Anubis Black  and Pirata Morgan 
Emperador Azteca  and El Hijo de Dos Caras 
Metaleon  and Negro Navarro 
Dragón Celestial  and Veneno 
Electro Boy  and X-Fly 
Atomic Star  and Eterno 
Alfa  and Máscara Sagrada 
Hip Hop Man  and El Hijo del Diablo

Results

References

External links
IWRG official website

2015 in professional wrestling
2015 in Mexico
2015
February 2015 events in Mexico